The 1901 Montana Agricultural football team was an American football team that represented the Agricultural College of the State of Montana (later renamed Montana State University) during the 1901 college football season. In its first season under head coach A. G. Harbaugh, the team compiled a 2–1 record with victories over the University of Montana and Butte Business College. The team outscored opponents by a total of 42 to 23. Right guard Ervin was the team captain.

Schedule

References

Montana Agricultural
Montana State Bobcats football seasons
Montana Agricultural football